An active volcano is a volcano which is either erupting or is likely to erupt in the future.  An active volcano which is not currently erupting is known as a dormant volcano.

Overview 
Tlocene Epoch. Most volcanoes are situated on the Pacific Ring of Fire. An estimated 500 million people live near active volcanoes.

Historical time (or recorded history) is another timeframe for active. However, the span of recorded history differs from region to region. In China and the Mediterranean, it reaches back nearly 3,000 years, but in the Pacific Northwest of the United States and Canada, it reaches back less than 300 years, and in Hawaii and New Zealand it is only around 200 years. The incomplete Catalogue of the Active Volcanoes of the World, published in parts between 1951 and 1975 by the International Association of Volcanology, uses this definition, by which there are more than 500 active volcanoes. , the Smithsonian Global Volcanism Program recognizes 560 volcanoes with confirmed historical eruptions.

As of 2013, the following are considered Earth's most active volcanoes:
 Kīlauea, the famous Hawaiian volcano, was in nearly continuous, effusive eruption (in which lava steadily flows onto the ground) between 1983 through 2018, and had the longest-observed lava lake.
 Mount Etna and nearby Stromboli, two Mediterranean volcanoes in "almost continuous eruption" since antiquity.
 Piton de la Fournaise, in Réunion, erupts frequently enough to be a tourist attraction.

, the longest ongoing (but not necessarily continuous) volcanic eruptive phases are:
 Mount Yasur, 111 years
 Mount Etna, 110 years
 Stromboli, 108 years
 Santa María, 101 years
 Sangay, 94 years

Other very active volcanoes include:
 Mount Nyiragongo and its neighbor, Nyamuragira, are Africa's most active volcanoes.
 Erta Ale, in the Afar Triangle, has maintained a lava lake since at least 1906.
 Mount Erebus, in Antarctica, has maintained a lava lake since at least 1972.
 Mount Merapi
 Whakaari / White Island, has been in a continuous state of releasing volcanic gas since before European observation in 1769.
 Ol Doinyo Lengai
 Ambrym
 Arenal Volcano
 Pacaya
 Klyuchevskaya Sopka
 Sheveluch

References

See also 
Category:Active volcanoes
Category:Potentially active volcanoes